"When I Get It" is a song co-written and recorded by American country music artist Craig Campbell.  It was released in December 2011 as the third single from the album Craig Campbell.  The song reached #38 on the Billboard Hot Country Songs chart.  The song was written by Campbell, Patrick Jason Matthews and Jim McCormick.

Content
The song tells the story of a goodhearted man trying to fight off bill collectors.  The first verse is that phone call trying those hurting for jobs and money know all too well.  He brushes him off saying/ "When I get it / you'll get it / Times are tough, get in line and wait / When I get it you'll get it / And that's all you're getting today."

He shows a wry sense of humor in the song's second verse.  "My ex wife's at the door knocking / Lord that woman won't leave me alone / Same question, where's my money / Well honey you can't get blood from a stone./"

Chart performance

References

2011 singles
2011 songs
Craig Campbell (singer) songs
Songs written by Craig Campbell (singer)
Songs written by Patrick Jason Matthews
Songs written by Jim McCormick (songwriter)
Song recordings produced by Keith Stegall
Bigger Picture Music Group singles